is an ongoing Japanese collaborative project between Studio Khara,  Toei Co., Ltd, Toho Co., Ltd and Tsuburaya Productions, and is developed by Hideaki Anno. The project is intended for merchandising purposes, uniting films that Anno had worked on bearing the katakana title "Shin" (シン・).

History

Development and announcement

In February 2022, Studio Khara,  Toei Co., Ltd, Toho Co., Ltd and Tsuburaya Productions announced a collaborative project titled "Shin Japan Heroes Universe", which unites properties that Hideaki Anno had worked on bearing the title "Shin", such as Shin Godzilla, Evangelion: 3.0+1.0 Thrice Upon a Time, Shin Ultraman and Shin Kamen Rider.

Back in 2016, Khara and Toho had previously collaborated on similar cross-over projects uniting Rebuild of Evangelion and Shin Godzilla such as Godzilla vs. Evangelion and Godzilla vs. Evangelion: The Real 4D.

The SJHU project came to fruition after a meeting between Khara, Toei, Toho, and Tsuburaya was held, under the supervision of Anno, who stated it "was conceived in the discussions of the related companies, from the idea of combining characters that are proud of Japanese culture, in a collaborative way, to further expand them around the world and stimulate fun. [...] Originally, projects with a wide range of copyright sources are difficult to adjust, and the commercial benefits are not significant. So it's a plan that can only be made by content holders who prioritize fan service over business cooperation itself." He also added that "it is a project that uses a common item called Shin as an expedient. In the future, the word Shin will be removed...we hope that the development of SJHU will please our fans as a new pleasure that transcends the boundaries of the character(s) worlds." The official logo was designed by Yutaka Izubuchi while the promotional visual teaser image was drawn by Mahiro Maeda.

In August 2022, Shinji Higuchi stated that the project is intended only for merchandise, special events, and tie-in events and that the films are meant to be individually separate rather than replicating the Marvel Cinematic Universe formula.

List of announced projects

 May 2022
 Bandai Namco Holdings announced the first SJHU project titled Shin Japan Heroes Amusement World, an amusement park set to debut for opening between July and November 2022 in the Bandai Namco Cross Stores located in Yokohama, Osaka, Umeda and Hakata.
 July 2022
 GungHo Online Entertainment added the Shin Godzilla incarnation of Godzilla and the Shin Ultraman incarnations of Ultraman, Neronga, Gabora, Zarab, Mefilas, and Zetton to their mobile puzzle video game Puzzle & Dragons.
 October 2022
 A pachinko game titled Godzilla vs. Evangelion: G Cells Awakening was announced.
 November 2022
 A Shin Japan Heroes Amusement World commemorative wristwatch was announced. The watch features a 41 mm case with a dial that showcases the four Shin franchises and will be available for pre-order from Premium Bandai on November 25 for ¥33,000.
 Tamashii Nations announced a new line of figures based on the designs of Eva-01, Godzilla, Kamen Rider and Ultraman.
January 2023
Uniqlo announced a new line of T-shirts for March 2023.
March 2023
An izakaya inspired by Evangelion: 3.0+1.0 Thrice Upon a Time and Shin Kamen Rider will open in Tokyo's Kabukicho district from March 10 to May 28.

See also
 Compati Hero
 MonsterVerse
 Rebuild of Evangelion
 Ultraman vs. Kamen Rider

Notes

References

External links
 Official website 
 Shin Godzilla 
 Evangelion 
 Shin Ultraman 
 Shin Kamen Rider 
  

Collaborative projects
Fictional universes
Giant monster films
Godzilla films
Kaiju films
Kamen Rider films
Neon Genesis Evangelion films
Reboot films
Toei Company films
Toho animated films
Toho films
Ultra Series films